Nathan Korn (1893-1941) was an American architect and builder in New York City.

Early life
Korn was educated at Cooper Union and Columbia University.

Career
He was known for reconstructing Russeks department stores.  His firm designed and built residential apartment buildings in Manhattan.

Selected works
 944 Fifth Avenue
 The Bolivar, 230 Central Park West
 327 Central Park West
 6-16 W 77th Street

References

1893 births
1941 deaths
Cooper Union alumni
Columbia University alumni